General elections were held in Mexico on July 1, 1928. Alvaro Obregón was the only candidate in the presidential elections, and was elected unopposed. He was assassinated just 16 days later, and Emilio Portes Gil was appointed to serve as interim president in his place.

Results

President

References

Presidential elections in Mexico
Mexico
General
Single-candidate elections
July 1928 events
Election and referendum articles with incomplete results